The Ephesus Archaeological Museum is an archaeological museum in Selçuk near the Ancient Greek city of İzmir, Turkey. It houses finds from the nearby Ephesus excavation site. Its best-known exhibit is the ancient statue of the Greek Goddess Artemis retrieved from the temple of the goddess in Ephesus.

There are approximately 64 thousand pieces exhibited in the Ephesus Museum.

The other museum with a great number of Ephesus artifacts is the Ephesus Museum in Vienna.

The museum closed at the end of 2012, and reopened in November 2014 after extensive renovations.

Sections in Ephesus Archaeological Museum 

 Terrace Houses Findings Hall
 Fountain Findings Hall
 New Findings and Small Findings Hall
 Great Courtyard
 Grave Findings Hall
 Artemis of Ephesus Hall
 Emperor Cults Hall
 Small Courtyard

References

Notes

External links
Official website
440 or so pictures from the museum
Detailed description of the museum's exhibitions with photos
Ephesus Travel Guide

Archaeological museums in Turkey
Ephesus
Museums in İzmir Province
Museums of ancient Rome in Turkey
Museums of Ancient Near East in Turkey